Stephen A. Appelbaum (1926–2000) was an American psychologist. He received his PhD from Boston University and the Bruno Klopfer Award in 1985.

References 

1926 births
2000 deaths
20th-century American psychologists
Boston University alumni
American psychologists